Transogram was an American producer of toys, games and other leisure products from the early 20th century to 1971. It is best known for such long-produced games as Tiddledy Winks and Game of India, as well as such baby-boomer favorites as Green Ghost and television tie-in board games for such characters and series as Atom Ant, The Flintstones, Gomer Pyle, U.S.M.C., Perry Mason and Tom and Jerry.

History

Early years
Around the turn of the 20th century, Charles Raizen took a summer job with a manufacturer of embroidery patterns. Years later, he found a method of transferring images using friction, and circa 1915, the company became the Friction Transfer Pattern Company, first located on 2nd Street, between Avenues C and D, in Manhattan, then at 113-115 University Place. It quickly found that children enjoyed transferring the friction patterns, and the company shifted toward children's products such as Art-Toy Transfer Pictures. In 1917, Raizen bought the company and renamed it Transogram, but using 1915 as the founding date in its company logo (see above). Moving to 200 Fifth Avenue, the company developed the Toy Research Institute in order to test toys with input by a child psychologist, leading to the 1920s tagline that its toys were "Kid Tested". The company also began licensing media properties, manufacturing the likes of a Little Orphan Annie set of clothes pins.

After producing toys, play sets and activity items, the company in 1929 produced its first game-like product, Orje, The Mystic Prophet, which one historian calls "a solitaire fortunetelling pastime".

In early 1939, the company announced that its new game Movie Millions would have a marketing push, headed by advertising manager Lee Sheldon, in magazines, trade magazines, newspapers and radio.

Later years
In 1955, Transogram introduced its first TV-series licensed board game, Dragnet.

In 1960, Transogram was one of seven toy-makers, including Ideal and Parker Brothers, that the Federal Trade Commission accused of violating antitrust law by allegedly soliciting discriminatory advertising allowances from suppliers.

Transogram advertised on television in 1968 for the first time in six years, with a million-dollar campaign centered on Green Ghost and Hocus Pocus, its two glow-in-the-dark games; Kabala, a future-telling game; and the printing kit Inkless Printing. The TV commercials were produced by the advertising agency Smith / Greenland.

Going public and final years
Following a previous incorporation in New York, the Transogram Company incorporated in Pennsylvania on September 4, 1959. In May 1962, Transogram made an initial public offering of 196,000 shares of common stock from Charles Raizen's private account. It sold for US$10 a share. Raizen retained control with 61.4 percent of outstanding stock.

In 1966, Transogram's total sales were $18,665,631. In the first six months of 1967, the company posted a loss of $1,191,000 on sales of $4,713,000, down from $6,169,000 in sales during the same period the year before. For the first nine months of 1970, Transogram reported a loss of $2,328,000 on sales of $21,642,000, compared to a loss of $293,000 on sales of $17,938,000 during the same period in 1969. Transogram announced in August 1969 that it had agreed to acquire 81 percent of the stock in Mountain Savings and Loan of Boulder, Colorado, in exchange for an unspecified number of shares of Transogram stock.

The financial holding company Winthrop Lawrence, controlled by du Pont heir Lammot du Pont Copeland Jr. and Thomas A. Sheehan, bought controlling interest in Transogram in 1969 and installed Joseph Bruna as chief executive officer. On February 26, 1971, Transogram declared Chapter 11 bankruptcy, listing liabilities of $12,067,307 and assets of $3,009,072. Trading on the American Stock Exchange had been suspended the week prior.

The Transogram trademark and assets were liquidated in 1971, with the marks and toy molds purchased by Jay Horowitz of American Plastic Equipment, who later transferred all rights to American Plastic Equipment's subsidiary, American Classic Toys. In 2019, American Classic Toys entered into an exclusive license agreement with The Juna Group to represent the Transogram brands in all categories, worldwide.

Products

Board games
Big Business (1935)
Game of India (1938) a.k.a. Pa-Chiz-Si: The Game of India
Wink Tennis
Tiddledy Winks (1938)
Ring the Schnozzle
Movie Millions
Happy Landing
Steps 'n' Slides
Betsy Ross Flag
Disneyland
Score a Word
Screwball: A Mad Mad Game
Jamoose
Superman
Green Ghost (1965)
Hocus Pocus
Kabala or Ka-Bala

Michigan Rummy & Ace-Hi Horse Race (2-in-1)

Licensed film & TV board games
Source unless otherwise noted:
Arrest and Trial
Around the World in 80 Days
Dragnet
Hogan's Heroes
Snagglepuss Fun at the Picnic
Johnny Ringo
The Monkees
Outlaws
Overland Trail
Perry Mason
Stoney Burke
Tic-Tac-Dough
The Virginian
Wyatt Earp

Other
Inkless Printing
The Little Country Doctor and Nurse Kit.
Paint by Number Mosaic Art Pictures 
Photomate (1967)
Pyrocon plastic modeling products
Swing Wing (c. 1965)

Subsidiaries and manufacturing plants

Source unless otherwise noted:
Anchor Toy Corporation
Graphic Products, Inc.
National Assembly Company 
Playwood Plastics Company
Toy Research Institute, Inc.
Toy Scouts of America
Transco Adult Games
Transogram Midwest, Inc.

Divisions
Tag, Inc., maker of jigsaw puzzles

Manufacturing plants
Sturgis, Michigan 
Easton, Pennsylvania
Sikeston, Missouri
Canada.

Personnel
Al Capp, prior to his success as the cartoonist creator of the comic strip Li'l Abner, was a graphic designer for Transogram.

By mid-1948, Harold Ross, formerly of Kermin, Thall and Lavelle,  had joined as advertising art director. In 1956, Jack Arnold, former advertising manager of Saxon Paper Corp., joined Transogram as advertising manager.

Leroy Fadem became Executive Vice President and Chief Financial Officer in the late 1950's and served in this position until 1971.

By 1968, Jerry Tolk was executive vice president of Transogram.

Founder Charles S. Raizen

Company founder Charles S. Raizen (1892-1967) and his wife Patricia Tolk were living in New Rochelle, New York, in 1958 when their son Roy R. Raizen became engaged. A graduate of the Salisbury School in Connecticut and of Lafayette College, and a U.S. Army first lieutenant who had been stationed in Europe, Roy Raizen was a vice president of Transogram at the time. In 1964, he was elevated from executive vice president in charge of operations to president. succeeding his father, who became chairman. The couple additionally had a daughter Edna Mae.

Charles Raizen, who served a stint as president of the Toy Manufacturers of the US, was residing at 309 Beechmont Drive in New Rochelle when he died on May 13, 1967, age 74, at the Plaza Hotel in Manhattan while attending a charity dinner. He was elected posthumously to the Toy Industry Hall of Fame in 1986.

References

External links
Transogram Company print advertising at Magazine-Advertisements.com. Retrieved on December 17, 2017.

Toy brands
Toy companies of the United States

American companies established in 1915

Manufacturing companies established in 1915

Companies formerly listed on NYSE American
Companies based in New York City